Leon Boyd (born August 30, 1983) is a Canadian-born Dutch baseball player currently playing for Corendon Kinheim in the Honkbal Hoofdklasse.  He is most often recognized for his accomplishments for the Dutch national team at the 2009 World Baseball Classic.

Baseball career

B.C. Premier Baseball League
Boyd was a starting pitcher for the White Rock Tritons of the British Columbia Premier Baseball League for three seasons.

College career
Boyd began his college baseball career playing for the Treasure Valley Community College in Ontario, Oregon during the  season. He played only one season for the Chukars before transferring to Seminole State Community College in Oklahoma for the  season. He played two seasons for the Pirates in 2004 and  where he was used exclusively as a relief pitcher. Over these two seasons, he appeared in 34 games and compiled a 3.44 ERA with 104 strikeouts in 115 innings pitched.

2006: Hoboken Pioneers
Despite his Dutch family ties and a strong desire to play baseball in the Netherlands, Boyd was not pursued by any Hoofdklasse clubs, even after numerous attempts to contact them after his college career was over.  Instead, he went on to play for the Hoboken Pioneers in Belgium where he had an extremely successful  season.  Not only did he accumulate an 11–1 win–loss record with a 0.84 ERA and 156 strikeouts in just 96 innings pitched, but he also hit .421 with 2 home runs in 38 at bats for the Pioneers, who finished the season as the national runner up.

Following his strong season in Belgium, Boyd was picked up by the Dutch national team to play in the 2006 Intercontinental Cup in Taichung, Taiwan.  Despite his 0–2 record, Boyd had a 2.63 ERA and led the Nethalnds in innings pitched.  Against Cuba, he took the loss in a 3–2 defeat where he allowed four hits and one run in  IP of relief after replacing Rob Cordemans.  Three days later, he allowed just one run in six innings against Japan but again lost as the Dutch were shut out.  His final appearance of the tournament came against Australia, where he struck out 7 and allowed one run in six innings in a no-decision as the Netherlands won 4–3.

2007: DOOR Neptunus
After being scouted by and in contract talks with several hoofdklasse teams, Boyd signed with Neptunus.  He made a debut during the 2007 regular season when he posted a 9–0 record with no home runs allowed in over 66 innings. His statistical totals in wins (9, tied with tied Vaughan Harris and Diego Markwell for second-most), ERA (1.22, behind only relievers Duko Jansen and Chris Ryan) and strikeouts (61, tied with former major leaguer Eddie Oropesa for sixth overall) were among the league leaders. He was a finalist for the Pitcher of the Year Award, but lost to David Bergman in part due to missing a month of the season with a back muscle strain. Despite his initial success, Boyd suffered two losses during the first round of the playoffs as Neptunus was upset by the Pioniers.

In the 2007 World Port Tournament, Boyd earned the World Port Tournament Best Pitcher award, allowing only five hits in 15 IP and won twice, including a complete-game shutout of the Chinese Taipei National team facing only 28 batters. He was 2–0 with a 0.93 ERA in the 2007 European Baseball Championship, helping the Netherlands win Gold. He was with the team for the 2007 Baseball World Cup, going 1–1 with a 2.55 ERA and a team-high 14 strikeouts for the 4th-place squad. He had a solid game but received a no-decision against the Australian national team when closer Michiel van Kampen couldn't hold a 3–2 lead in the ninth. He had another appearance allowing one run in six innings in a crucial win over the South Korean national team and matched Tadashi Settsu (the eventual pitcher of the tournament) with five scoreless frames in the bronze medal game before allowing 2 runs in the 6th, and being shut out 5–0 by the Japanese.

2008: Beijing Olympics
On June 12, 2008, Boyd threw a no-hitter against the Amsterdam Pirates. He allowed two runs, one unearned, thanks to 3 walks, 2 hit batsmen and 3 errors by his team. Shortly thereafter, Boyd had a 4.50 ERA in the 2008 European Baseball Cup in Regensburg. He was knocked out early in a win against the host Buchbinder Legionäre and did not get a decision in the Cup.

Head coach Robert Eenhoorn selected Boyd to pitch for the Netherlands at the 2008 Summer Olympics in Beijing.  In their second game of the tournament against the United States, Boyd entered the game during the 8th inning with the bases loaded and one out after Dave Draijer was struck by a batted ball on the right forearm.  He induced two groundouts, resulting in only a single run for the United States.  He returned to pitch the top of the 9th inning, and after yielding a leadoff single to Terry Tiffee, Boyd retired the next three batters, including Matt LaPorta by strikeout.  However, a two-hour rain delay forced the game to be called during the Dutch half of the 9th inning.  As a result Boyd's statistics during the 9th inning are unofficial, as the score reverted to the last completed inning.

Boyd made his second appearance of the tournament on August 16, 2008 when he was the starting pitcher against China.  He struck out six batters in six innings, yielding only six hits and two runs in the process.  The win was the only victory the Dutch earned all tournament.

2009

World Baseball Classic
Boyd was selected once again to represent the Dutch national team at the 2009 World Baseball Classic.  Although he has primarily been a starter throughout his career, Boyd was asked by head coach Rod Delmonico to serve as the closer for the Netherlands.  During the first round of the tournament held at Hiram Bithorn Stadium in San Juan, Puerto Rico, Boyd entered three separate games during tense, late-inning pressure situations, including two of which he ended up as the pitcher of record.

In the Netherlands' first game of the tournament on March 7, 2009 against the heavily favored Dominican Republic, Boyd pitched the 9th inning and earned the save with a game-ending strikeout of José Bautista.  Two days later, he entered a game against Puerto Rico with the bases loaded and only one out in the 8th inning, only to give up a two-run double to Yadier Molina and an RBI-single to Jesus Feliciano.  The very next day, Boyd rebounded to earn the win in a 2–1 extra-innings Dutch victory that eliminated the Dominicans from the tournament.

Although the Dutch advanced to play in Round 2 of the tournament at Dolphin Stadium in Miami, Florida, Boyd would not make his fourth appearance of the tournament until the 6th inning of an elimination game against the United States.  Despite giving up a home run to Adam Dunn, Boyd struck out both David Wright and Ryan Braun in his one inning of relief.

New Hampshire Fisher Cats
Following his strong pitching performance in the tournament, Boyd was signed by the Toronto Blue Jays to a minor-league contract.  Although he was temporarily reassigned to the Dunedin Blue Jays of the Florida State League for an 8-game appearance early in the year, Boyd played the bulk of the 2009 season as a member of the Jays AA-affiliate, the New Hampshire Fisher Cats.  He finished the year with a 1–6 win–loss record, a 4.76 ERA, 51 strikeouts and 6 saves in over 64 innings for the two clubs.

2010
The Blue Jays released Boyd in March 2010 and subsequently re-signed with Neptunus.  According to Boyd, his release was affected by his high walk count and the Jays' trading of Roy Halladay to the Philadelphia Phillies in December 2009.
With the release of Roy Halladay the Blue Jays brought in many potential bottom rotation, triple A caliber potential big league replacements.

2013

He joined the Dutch National team for the 2013 World Baseball Classic.

Personal life
Growing up, Boyd attended high school at Earl Marriott Secondary School in South Surrey, British Columbia.  Although he was born in Canada, Leon received his Dutch passport in December, 2005, as a result of his mother being born and raised in the Netherlands.  Boyd's father, Sean, played ice hockey in the Netherlands from 1971 to 1974 and met Leon's mother, Wilma, there.  Boyd married American softball player Jeana Short on March 8, 2008.  He has an older sister, Nadine.

References

External links

Boyd's profile at honkbalsite.com 
Boyd's Sport-1 profile 
Globe and Mail article
Minor League Baseball

1983 births
Living people
Baseball people from British Columbia
Baseball players at the 2008 Summer Olympics
Canadian people of Dutch descent
Canadian expatriate baseball players in the United States
Dunedin Blue Jays players
Dutch expatriate baseball players in the United States
New Hampshire Fisher Cats players
Olympic baseball players of the Netherlands
Sportspeople from Vancouver
2009 World Baseball Classic players
2013 World Baseball Classic players